Elissa Wright (born April 14, 1946) is an American politician who served in the Connecticut House of Representatives from the 41st district from 2007 to 2015.

References

1946 births
Living people
Democratic Party members of the Connecticut House of Representatives